The Centre d’expertise aérienne militaire, or also widely known as CEAM, is the main French aeronautical research and test centre, in south-west France, towards Spain. It is currently located at Mont-de-Marsan Air Base, Aquitaine.

History
Mont-de-Marsan (Base aérienne 118 Mont-de-Marsan) was the home of France's first nuclear bombers, the Dassault Mirage IV.

CEAM was established as the Centre d'expériences aériennes militaires at Reims in northern France (Grand Est) on 26 April 1933, then moved to Orléans – Bricy Air Base BA 123 (Centre-Val de Loire) in 1939, and Mont-de-Marsan in 1945. CEAM is translated as the Military Air Experiment Centre.

CEAM changed its name to Centre d’expertise aérienne militaire on 1 September 2015.

Structure
It is situated at Mont-de-Marsan Air Base (ICAO: LFBM), directly to the north of Mont-de-Marsan, in Landes, Aquitaine. It is accessed via the D53 road (for Canenx-et-Réaut), off the D834. The north–south A65 autoroute is a few miles to the east.

See also
 CEA Cesta, where the French design their nuclear weapons
 French air defence radar systems

References

External links
 CEAM
 French government

Military units and formations of the French Air and Space Force
Military units and formations established in 1933
1933 establishments in France
Mont-de-Marsan
Organizations based in Reims
Research institutes established in 1933
Research institutes in France
Military research of France